Jean Grenier (6 February 1898 – 5 March 1971, Dreux-Venouillet, Eure-et-Loir) was a French philosopher and writer. He taught for a time in Algiers, where he became a significant influence on the young Albert Camus.

Biography 
Born in Paris, Grenier spent his childhood and adolescence in Saint-Brieuc, Brittany, the birthplace of Jules Lequier, the visionary philosopher to whom Grenier would eventually dedicate his doctoral thesis. These early years, during which he became acquainted with Louis Guilloux, Edmond Lambert and Max Jacob, are documented in his autobiographical novel Les grèves (1957). In 1922 Grenier gained a teaching qualification in philosophy and began his academic career at the Institut français in Naples, alongside Henri Bosco. He then spent some time working on the literary journal La Nouvelle Revue française (NRF) before returning to teaching as a professor of philosophy in Algiers, the capital of Algeria. Albert Camus became a student of Grenier's and a close friendship developed between them. Strongly influenced by Les Îles, which came out in 1933, Camus dedicated his first book to Grenier: L'envers et l'endroit, published in Algeria by Edmond Charlot. His L'homme révolté was also dedicated to Grenier, and Camus provided the preface to the second edition of Les Îles in 1959.

However, the two thinkers followed very different ideological paths. While Camus was drawn to rebellion, despite his criticism of violent revolution in L'Homme revolte, and ultimately the desperate cries of La Chute, Grenier was more contemplative, adopting the Taoist principle of wu wei and surreptitiously practising a quietist version of Christianity.

Grenier's 1938 Essai sur l'esprit d'orthodoxie is essentially a distillation of his writings from 1936 and 1937. Although it tackles the burning issues of the day, it was intended to be "a reaction against them". This essay gave rise to a generation of intellectuals divided by their attitudes towards communism.

Grenier was well known in the intellectual circles of the time and contributed to numerous literary journals, including L'Œil, XXe Siècle and Preuves. A friend of Jean Paulhan, he frequently wrote for the NRF. Grenier had an arts column in the newspaper Combat while Camus was editor, and one in L'Express under Jean Daniel. Following a period of teaching in Alexandria and Cairo (where he met André Gide, Edmond Jabès, Jean Cocteau, Taha Hussein, Étiemble and Georges Perros) as well as teaching at the Faculty of Arts in Lille, Grenier held a chair in aesthetics and science of art at the Sorbonne from 1962 to 1968.

Grenier was particularly interested in the development of non-figurative art and wrote mainly on the subject of contemporary painting, including works such as: L'esprit de la peinture contemporaine, Essais sur la peinture contemporaine and Entretiens avec dix-sept peintres non-figuratifs. A summary of his reflections on the history of aesthetics, written for his students at the Sorbonne, may be found in L'art et ses problèmes.

Until his death in 1971, Grenier regularly published works dealing with a wide range of philosophical questions, among them: Le choix, Entretiens sur le bon usage de la liberté, L'esprit du Tao and L'existence malheureuse. Somewhat more mundane topics included: Sur la mort d'un chien and La vie quotidienne. He filled notebooks with details of his relationships with Francine Camus, René Char, Louis Guilloux, Jean Giono, André Malraux and Manès Sperber and with the editorial team of the Nouvelle Nouvelle Revue française, as well as his conversations with numerous contemporary artists who visited him at his home in Bourg-la-Reine. Towards the end, he also wrote down some surprising definitions of technical terms and made some rather whimsical observations. In November 1968, just after the publication of Albert Camus – souvenirs, Grenier was awarded the Grand Prix national des lettres.

Published works
 Interiora rerum, Grasset, Collection: Les Cahiers verts, 70, 1927
 Cum apparuerit, Collection: Terrasses de Lourmarin 19, Audin, 1930
 Les Îles, Collection: "Les Essais" n°7, Gallimard, 1933 Reprinted under the title: "L'imaginaire", 1977
 La philosophie de Jules Lequier, Vrin, 1936
 Santa Cruz et autres paysages africains, Collection: Méditerranéennes 4, Charlot, 1937
 Essai sur l'esprit d'orthodoxie, Gallimard, Les Essais n°5, 1938
 Le Choix, Presses Universitaires de France, 1941
 L’Existence, Gallimard, Collection: La Métaphysique, 1945
 Sextus Empiricus (translation) Aubier, 1948
 Entretiens sur le bon usage de la liberté, Paris, Gallimard, 1948
 L'esprit de la peinture contemporaine, Vineta, 1951
 Œuvres complètes de Jules Lequier (presentation), La Baconnière, 1952
 Lexique, Gallimard, Collection: Métamorphoses n°48, 1955
 A propos de l'humain, Gallimard, Collection: Les Essais n°74, 1955
 Les Grèves, Gallimard, 1957
 Sur la mort d'un chien, Gallimard, 1957
 L'esprit du Tao, Flammarion, 1957
 L'existence malheureuse, Gallimard, 1957
 Essais sur la peinture contemporaine, Gallimard, 1959
 Lanskoy, Hazan, Collection: Peintres d'aujourd'hui, 1960
 Absolu et choix, Presses Universitaires de France (Introduction to philosophy), 1961
 Borès, Verve, 1961
 Lettres d'Égypte followed by Un Été au Liban, Gallimard, 1962
 L'Imitation et les principes de l'esthétique classique, C.D.U.(The Sorbonne Lectures: Esthétique), 1963
 Entretiens avec dix-sept peintres non figuratifs, Calmann-Lévy, 1963, Reprinted by Editions Folle Avoine, 1990
 Vicissitudes de l'esthétique et révolution du goût, C.D.U.(The Sorbonne Lectures: Esthétique), 1965
 Célébration du miroir, Robert Morel, 1965
 La vie quotidienne, Gallimard, 1968
 Jules Lequier – La dernière page, Illustrated by Ubac, Gaston Puel, 1968
 Albert Camus – Souvenirs, Gallimard, 1968
 Senancour: les plus belles pages (presentation), Mercure de France, 1968
 Lexique, illustrated by Hadju, Fata Morgana, 1969
 Entretiens avec Louis Foucher, Gallimard, 1969
 Quatre prières, illustrated Madeleine Grenier, Gaston Puel, 1970
 L'art et ses problèmes, Éditions Rencontres, 1970
 Quatre prières, Illustrated by Madeleine Grenier, Gaston Puel, 1970
 Music, Le Musée de Poche, 1970
 Molinos: le guide spirituel (presentation), Fayard, 1970
 Mémoires intimes de X, Robert Morel, 1971
 Voir Naples, Gallimard, 1973
 Les poèmes brûlés, Nane Stern, 1973
 Réflexions sur quelques écrivains, Gallimard, 1973
 Jacques, Calligrammes, 1979
 Portrait de Jean Giono, Robert Morel, 1979
 Miroirs, illustrated by Arpad Szenes, Fata Morgana, 1980
 Jean Grenier – Georges Perros : correspondence 1950–1971, Calligrammes, 1980
 Correspondence avec Albert Camus (1932–1960), Gallimard, 1981
 Écrire et publier, Calligrammes, 1982
 Vie de Saint-Gens, followed by images by Saint-Gens par André de Richaud, Calligrammes, 1983
 Prières, illustrated by Zoran Music, Fata Morgana, 1983
 Le chant du voleur d'amour by Bilhana (presentation), Calligrammes, 1983
 Écrits sur le quiétisme, Calligrammes, 1984
 Jean Grenier – Jean Paulhan : correspondence 1925–1968, Calligrammes, 1984
 Premier voyage en Italie – 1921, Calligrammes, 1986
 Ombre et lumière, illustrated by Pierre Tal Coat, Fata Morgana, 1986
 Mes candidatures à la Sorbonne, Calligrammes, 1987
 Les A-peu-près, Ramsay, 1987
 La dernière page, preface by Jean Clair, Ramsay, 1987
 Mes candidatures à la Sorbonne, Calligrammes, 1987
 Jean Grenier – René Etiemble : correspondence 1945–1971, Folle Avoine, 1988
 Carnets 1944 – 1971, collection "Pour Mémoire", Seghers, 1991 (reprinted by les Éditions Claire Paulhan, 1999)
 Sur l’Inde, foreword by Olivier Germain-Thomas, Fata Morgana, 1994
 Sous l'occupation, Editions Claire Paulhan, 1997

Bibliography 
 LA NRF, N°221, May 1971 : "JEAN GRENIER", texts by Henri Bosco, Etiemble, Georges Perros, Roger Judrin, Jean Daniel, Roger Grenier, Jean Clair, Antoine Terrasse, Roger Quesnoy, Yvon Belaval, Gaëtan Picon, suivis de « L’Escalier », par Jean Grenier.
 BARRIERE G. : Jean Grenier, l'exil et le royaume. Mémoire de maîtrise présenté à la Sorbonne en 1973.
 TAROT C. : Problèmes du sujet dans l'œuvre et la pensée de Jean Grenier. Thèse de 3ème cycle soutenue à l'Université de Caen en 1981.
 GARFITT J.S.T. : The Work and Thought of Jean Grenier (1898–1971), MHRA Texts and Dissertations, Vol. 20, The Modern Humanities Research Association, Oxford, 1983.
 CORNEAU P. : L'Humain et l'Absolu dans Les Iles de Jean Grenier. Mémoire de maîtrise présenté à la Faculté des Lettres d'Amiens en 1985.
 CORNEAU P. : Présentation critique de Jean Grenier. Mémoire de D.E.A. en Littérature française et spiritualité présenté à la Faculté des Lettres de Metz en 1986.
 Cahier Jean Grenier sous la direction de Jacques André, Editions Folle Avoine, 1990.
Les Instants privilégiés, [Colloque de Cerisy][1] sous la direction de Jacques André, Editions Folle Avoine, 1992.
 Les Chemins de l’Absolu, Actes du Colloque Jean Grenier, Saint-Brieuc, 21 et 22 novembre 1998, Editions Folle Avoine, 1999.
 MILLET Y. : Jean Grenier et l'esprit du Tao : le non-agir comme raison de l'œuvre, Thèse de doctorat en science de l'art, université de Paris 1, 1999.
 Albert Camus, Jean Grenier, Louis Guilloux : écriture autobiographique et carnets, actes des Rencontres méditerranéennes, 5 et 6 octobre 2001, Château de Lourmarin, Editions Folle Avoine, 2003.
 Figure de Jean Grenier, Arearevue) (n°5, Septembre 2003).
 Cahier Jean Grenier, Revue EUROPE n°897–898, janvier-février 2004.
 CORNEAU P. : Une attention aimante, Jean Grenier – Ecrits sur l’art (1944–1971), choix d’articles de critique d’art et d’esthétique de Jean Grenier, Presses Universitaires de Rennes, Collection Critique d'Art, 2008.

1898 births
1971 deaths
Writers from Paris
French male non-fiction writers
20th-century French philosophers
20th-century French male writers